Alessandro Selvini (born Amaseno, 24 March 2004) is an Italian football player. He plays for Frosinone.

Club career
He made his Serie B debut for Frosinone on 5 April 2022 in a game against Pordenone.

Palmares
Campionato Primavera 2021/22

References

External links
 

2004 births
Living people
Italian footballers
Association football forwards
Frosinone Calcio players
Serie B players